The National Infrastructure Advisory Council (NIAC) is a United States government advisory council, which advises the President of the United States on the security of information systems in banking, finance, transportation, energy, manufacturing, and emergency government services. The George W. Bush Administration's executive order 13231 of October 16, 2001 created the NIAC, and its functioning was last extended until September 30, 2021 by executive order 13889 of the Donald Trump Administration.

In August 2017, 8 of the 28 members resigned. They believed that President Donald Trump had given "insufficient attention to the growing threats to the cybersecurity of the critical systems upon which all Americans depend".

Purpose
The NIAC provides the United States President, through the Secretary of Homeland Security, with advice on the security of critical infrastructures, both physical and cyber, supporting sectors of the economy. It also has the authority to provide advice directly to the heads of other agencies that have shared responsibility for critical infrastructure protection, including Health and Human Services, Transportation, and Energy. The NIAC is charged to improve the cooperation and partnership between the public and private sectors in securing the critical infrastructures and advises on policies and strategies that range from risk assessment and management to information sharing to protective strategies and clarification on roles and responsibilities between public and private sectors.

Background
The National Infrastructure Advisory Council (NIAC) was created by Executive Order 13231 of October 16, 2001, and amended by Executive Order 13286 of February 28, 2003, Executive Order 13385 of September 29, 2005, Executive Order 13446 of September 28, 2007, and Executive Order 13511 of September 29, 2009. The council is composed of not more than 30 members, appointed by the president, who are selected from the private sector, academia, and State and local government, representing senior executive leadership expertise from the critical infrastructure and key resource areas as delineated in HSPD-7.
LEADERSHIP: The position of NIAC chair and vice-chair are named by the president. Currently, the NIAC Chair position is held by Mr. Erle A. Nye, chairman emeritus, TXU Corporation, and Mr. Alfred R. Berkeley III, chairman, Pipeline Trading, LLC, serves as the vice-chair.

NIAC operations
The NIAC meets publicly four times each year. All meetings, whether in person or by teleconference, are hosted in Washington, D.C. in a venue open to the public and members desiring to attend in person. The council uses its public meetings as working meetings, focused on progress reports from its working groups, and on deliberations to produce useful and actionable recommendations in a timely manner. The council is very active, taking on up to six major studies per year, with high-performance goals of delivering quality, well-researched reports between 6–12 months from the inception of the selected studies. Its reports have drawn public and private sector interest with regular requests from Congressional committees for copies. Public meetings are normally attended by several members of the Press. The president meets with the council at least once a year and has directed very specific requests to the council for recommendations on issues of interest. The White House monitors the progress of the Council’s studies on a regular basis between meetings through a liaison in the Homeland Security Council.

Resignations
A month before funding ceased, 8 of the 28 members resigned. They believed that President Donald Trump has given "insufficient attention to the growing threats to the cybersecurity of the critical systems upon which all Americans depend, including those impacting the systems supporting our democratic election process,", they also mentioned "his failure "to denounce intolerance and violence of hate groups" when asked about the "horrific violences in Charlottesville", and they pointed to his move to withdraw from the Paris Agreement.

NIAC membership
As of February 2020, the members of the NIAC were:
Chair: Constance H. Lau, president, and chief executive officer, Hawaiian Electric Industries.
Vice Chair: Beverly A. Scott, CEO, Beverly Scott Associates, LLC.
Jan Allman, president of Marinette Marine Corporation.
J. Rich Baich, Chief Information Security Officer, American Insurance Group (AIG).
Rand Beers, former acting secretary of the United States Department of Homeland Security.
Georges C. Benjamin, executive director of the American Public Health Association.
William Terry Boston, former chief executive officer of PJM Interconnection.
Robert O. Carr, founder, and chief executive officer, Heartland Payment Systems.
Albert J. Edmonds, lieutenant general, USAF (retired), president and CEO of Edmonds Enterprise Services, Inc.
William J. Fehrman, president, and CEO of Berkshire Hathaway Energy.
Benjamin Fowke, chairman and CEO of Xcel Energy.
Margaret E. Grayson, consultant, E2M, LLC.
George Hawkins, former CEO, and general manager of the District of Columbia Water and Sewer Authority.
Reynold Hoover, former deputy commander, U.S. Northern Command.
Rhoda Mae Kerr, fire chief, City of Fort Lauderdale Fire Rescue.
Richard H. Ledgett Jr., senior visiting fellow, The MITRE Corporation.
Randolph R. Lowell, partner, Willoughby & Hoefer.
Joan M. McDonald, director of operations, Westchester County, New York.
Kevin M. Morley, manager, Federal relations, American Water Works Association.
James J. Murren, chairman and chief executive officer, MGM Resorts International.
Carl Newman, CEO, Jackson Municipal Airport Authority in Mississippi.
Kirstjen Nielsen, president of Lighthouse Strategies and former secretary of the United States Department of Homeland Security.
Keith T. Parker, president, and CEO of Goodwill Industries of North Georgia.
Ola Sage, founder, and CEO of CyberRx.
Michael J. Wallace, former vice-chairman, and COO, Constellation Energy.

References

 

United States Department of Homeland Security
United States national commissions